Fîrlădeni may refer to several places:

Fîrlădeni, a commune in Căușeni District
Fîrlădeni, a commune in Hîncești District